The Advanced Systems Analysis Program (ASAP) is optical engineering software used to simulate optical systems.  ASAP can handle coherent as well as incoherent light sources.  It is a non-sequential ray tracing tool which means that it can be used not only to analyze lens systems but also for stray light analysis. It uses a Gaussian beam approximation for analysis of coherent sources.

See also 
Optical engineering
Optical lens design
List of ray tracing software

External links 
 NASA Tech article on ASAP
 Breault Research Organization Website

Optical software
Windows-only software